Re'quan Boyette is an American football coach and former player. He currently serves as the co-offensive coordinator and wide receivers coach at Duke University. A Duke graduate himself, Boyette lettered for five years as a running back for the Blue Devils from 2005 to 2009, and has spent his entire coaching career with the team.

Playing career
Boyette spent five years as a member of the Duke Blue Devils football program, lettering each year from 2005 to 2009. He led the team in rushing in 2006 and 2007, but was sidelined in 2008 due to an injury. Despite this, he was still voted a team captain for that season, and was voted to the same honor the following season.

In October 2008, Boyette was selected to the American Football Coaches Association Good Works Team, which recognizes players for their volunteer community service. He was the second Duke player to be named to the team, and was recognized at a ceremony held during the Sugar Bowl in New Orleans.

Coaching career
Boyette joined the Duke coaching staff in 2012 as a graduate assistant before being promoted to running backs coach for the 2013 season. In his eight years in this position, he coached players including Juwan Thompson, Shaun Wilson, Mataeo Durant, and Deon Jackson. Boyette's players broke multiple school records under his tenure; Wilson set a single-game rushing record in 2014 and Jackson broke the all-purpose yardage record in 2018.

Prior to the start of the 2021 season, Boyette was promoted to co-offensive coordinator, alongside Jeff Faris, and was given the role of wide receivers coach as well.

Personal life
Boyette graduated from Duke University in 2009 with a Bachelor of Arts in sociology. He is married to Khristen, with whom he has one child.

References

Year of birth missing (living people)
Living people
American football running backs
Duke Blue Devils football coaches
Duke Blue Devils football players
People from Wilson, North Carolina
21st-century American people